The 1953 Taça de Portugal Final was the final match of the 1952–53 Taça de Portugal, the 13th season of the Taça de Portugal, the premier Portuguese football cup competition organized by the Portuguese Football Federation (FPF). The match was played on 28 June 1953 at the Estádio Nacional in Oeiras, and opposed two Primeira Liga sides: Benfica and Porto. Benfica defeated Porto 5–0 to claim their seventh Taça de Portugal.

Match

Details

References

1953
Taca
S.L. Benfica matches
FC Porto matches